Cucullia asteroides, known generally as the goldenrod hooded owlet or asteroid moth, is a species of moth in the family Noctuidae (the owlet moths). It is found in North America.

The MONA or Hodges number for Cucullia asteroides is 10200.

References

Further reading

External links
 

Cucullia
Articles created by Qbugbot
Moths described in 1852